Dayton Seymour Mak (July 10, 1917 – March 16, 2018) was an American diplomat who served posts in England, Libya, Lebanon, Kuwait, Saudi Arabia, and Germany. He was the first U.S. Chargé d'Affaires of Kuwait. Mak was also former Director of the Bureau of Intelligence and Research, for Near East South Asia Affairs.

Biography
Mak was born in Sioux Falls, South Dakota on July 10, 1917, but was raised in Iowa. Mak served in the United States Army during World War II between 1941 and 1945. He was awarded two Purple Hearts and one Bronze Star. In 1946, Mak joined the Foreign Service, serving as Vice Consul in Hamburg, Germany, Dhahran, Saudi Arabia, Jidda, Saudi Arabia, and Tripoli, Libya. In 1962, Mak became the first U.S. Ambassador to Kuwait and was responsible for establishing the embassy. In 1969, Mak became the director of INR for near-east south Asia Affairs. Mak officially retired from the Foreign Service in 1970. Mak was close friends with Francis Meloy, US Ambassador who was assassinated in Beirut, Lebanon. Meloy was best man at Mak's wedding.

Beginning in the late 1980s, Mak volunteered to help the newly create Association for Diplomatic Studies (later Association for Diplomatic Studies and Training, or ADST). He conducted a few interviews for oral histories before beginning to create tables of contents for the oral history collection. Mak continued his volunteer service to ADST until 2014.

Service chronology

Publications
Co-author, American Ambassadors in a Troubled World: Interviews with American Diplomats (1992, interviews, with Charles Stuart Kennedy)

Peer reviewer, Strangers When We Met (Nat Howell)

See also
Francis Meloy, the US ambassador of Lebanon who was assassinated.
Charles Stuart Kennedy, American historian

References

1917 births
2018 deaths
American centenarians
American expatriates in Kuwait
American expatriates in the United Kingdom
American expatriates in Libya
American expatriates in Lebanon
American expatriates in Saudi Arabia
American expatriates in Germany
Men centenarians
United States Army personnel of World War II
People from Sioux Falls, South Dakota